Carolyn Abraham is a British-born Canadian freelance journalist and author.

Biography
She was born in 1968 in London, England, and moved to Canada in 1972 with her parents and three older siblings. She grew up in St. Catharines, Ontario. and Mississauga, Ontario.

Abraham graduated with a Bachelor of Arts degree in journalism from Carleton University in 1991, and worked for the Ottawa Citizen from 1991 to 1997.  She later worked for The Globe and Mail as the senior medical reporter from February 1998 to January 2012. She won a National Newspaper Award in 2008 for her work on diagnosing bipolar disorder in children.

Her first book, Possessing Genius: The Bizarre Odyssey of Einstein's Brain was released in seven countries. It followed the travels of post-autopsy Albert Einstein's brain. It was a finalist for the Governor General's Award for English-language non-fiction at the 2002 Governor General's Awards. Her second book, The Juggler's Children: A Journey into Family, Legend and the Genes that Bind Us was released by Random House of Canada on March 26, 2013. It details her use of DNA testing and document searches to learn about her ancestry.

Awards and nominations

References

External links
 
 
 
 

1968 births
Canadian newspaper journalists
Canadian non-fiction writers
Canadian women non-fiction writers
Carleton University alumni
Canadian women journalists
English emigrants to Canada
Living people
Naturalized citizens of Canada
The Globe and Mail people